United Automobile Workers v. Johnson Controls, Inc., 499 U.S. 187 (1991), was a decision by the Supreme Court of the United States establishing that private sector policies prohibiting women from knowingly working in potentially hazardous occupations are discriminatory and in violation of Title VII and the Pregnancy Discrimination Act of 1978. The case revolved around Johnson Controls' policy of excluding fertile women from working in battery manufacturing jobs because batteries contain high amounts of lead, which entails health risks to people's reproductive systems (both men and women) and fetuses. At the time the case was heard, it was considered one of the most important sex-discrimination cases since the passage of Title VII.

Opinion of the Court
The majority opinion by Justice Blackmun held that that Title VII prohibits gender–specific fetal protection policies. Hence based on that statute,  the Court decided against Johnson Controls by concluding that the company’s fetal protection policy contravened Title VII of the Civil Rights Act of 1964, as amended by the PDA; and the company's gender-specific rule was biased and inequitable because it permitted fertile men, but not fertile women, to decide whether to work in jobs subjected to lead exposure while manufacturing batteries. The court rejected Johnson Controls' argument that their policy fell under the Bona Fide Occupational Qualification (BFOQ) defense because the protection of employees' fetuses was not an essential part of the business's operation.

References

Further reading

External links
 

United States Supreme Court cases
United States Supreme Court cases of the Rehnquist Court
1991 in United States case law
1991 in Wisconsin
Wisconsin law
Civil rights in the United States
Women's rights in the United States
United States civil rights case law
Gender discrimination lawsuits
History of the United Auto Workers